This is a list of known United States Engineer Regiments in existence at the time of World War II.

 13th Engineer General Service Regiment
 38th Engineer General Service Regiment
 41st Engineer General Service Regiment - to Liberia as part of U.S. Army Forces in Liberia under United States Army Forces in the Middle East. 
 42nd Engineer General Service Regiment
 43rd Engineer General Service Regiment
44th Engineer General Service Regiment
 45th Engineer General Service Regiment
 46th Engineer General Service Regiment
 47th Engineer General Service Regiment
 91st Engineer General Service Regiment
 92nd Engineer General Service Regiment
 93rd Engineer General Service Regiment
 94th Engineer General Service Regiment
 95th Engineer General Service Regiment
 96th Engineer General Service Regiment
 97th Engineer General Service Regiment
 98th Engineer General Service Regiment
 111th Engineer Regiment
 175th Engineer General Service Regiment
 177th Engineer General Service Regiment
 224th Engineer General Service Regiment
 226th Engineer General Service Regiment
 330th Engineer General Service Regiment
 332nd Engineer General Service Regiment
 333rd Engineer Special Service Regiment
 334th Engineer Special Service Regiment
 337th Engineer General Service Regiment
 338th Engineer General Service Regiment
 340th Engineer General Service Regiment
 341st Engineer General Service Regiment
 342nd Engineer General Service Regiment
 343rd Engineer General Service Regiment
 344th Engineer General Service Regiment
 345th Engineer General Service Regiment
 346th Engineer General Service Regiment
 348th Engineer Combat Regiment (348th.com)
 349th Engineer General Service Regiment
 350th Engineer General Service Regiment
 351st Engineer General Service Regiment
 352nd Engineer General Service Regiment
 354th Engineer General Service Regiment
 355th Engineer General Service Regiment
 356th Engineer General Service Regiment
 357th Engineer General Service Regiment
 358th Engineer General Service Regiment
 360th Engineer General Service Regiment
 361st Engineer Special Service Regiment
 362nd Engineer General Service Regiment
 364th Engineer General Service Regiment
 365th Engineer General Service Regiment
 366th Engineer General Service Regiment
 368th Engineer General Service Regiment
 372nd Engineer General Service Regiment
 373rd Engineer General Service Regiment
 374th Engineer General Service Regiment
 375th Engineer General Service Regiment
 377th Engineer General Service Regiment
 388th Engineer General Service Regiment
 389th Engineer General Service Regiment
 390th Engineer General Service Regiment
 392nd Engineer General Service Regiment
 393rd Engineer General Service Regiment
 393rd Engineer Special Service Regiment
 398th Engineer General Service Regiment
 465th Engineer General Service Regiment
 531st Engineer Shore Regiment
 532nd Engineer Boat and Shore Regiment
 533rd Engineer Boat and Shore Regiment
 534th Engineer Boat and Shore Regiment
 540th Engineer Shore Regiment
 542nd Engineer Boat and Shore Regiment
 543rd Engineer Boat and Shore Regiment
 544th Engineer Boat and Shore Regiment
 592nd Engineer Boat and Shore Regiment
 593rd Engineer Boat and Shore Regiment
 594th Engineer Boat and Shore Regiment
 689th Engineer Base Equipment Company
 868th Engineer Aviation Regiment
 869th Engineer Aviation Regiment
 922nd Engineer Aviation Regiment
 923rd Engineer Aviation Regiment
 924th Engineer Aviation Regiment
 925th Engineer Aviation Regiment
 926th Engineer Aviation Regiment
 929th Engineer Aviation Regiment
 932nd Engineer Aviation Regiment
 1303rd Engineer General Service Regiment
 1306th Engineer General Service Regiment
 1307th Engineer General Service Regiment
 1310th Engineer General Service Regiment
 1311th Engineer General Service Regiment
 1312th Engineer General Service Regiment
 1313th Engineer General Service Regiment
 1314th Engineer General Service Regiment
 1315th Engineer General Service Regiment
 1316th Engineer General Service Regiment
 1317th Engineer General Service Regiment
 1318th Engineer General Service Regiment
 1319th Engineer General Service Regiment
 1320th Engineer General Service Regiment
 1321st  Engineer General Service Regiment
 1322nd  Engineer General Service Regiment
 1323rd  Engineer General Service Regiment
 1324th  Engineer General Service Regiment
 1325th Engineer General Service Regiment
 1326th Engineer General Service Regiment
 1327th Engineer General Service Regiment
 1329th Engineer General Service Regiment
 1330th Engineer General Service Regiment
 1331st Engineer General Service Regiment
 1332nd Engineer General Service Regiment
 1333rd Engineer General Service Regiment
 1334th Engineer General Service Regiment
 1349th Engineer General Service Regiment
 1553rd Engineer General Service Regiment
 1554th Engineer General Service Regiment
 1749th Engineer General Service Regiment
 2822nd Engineer General Service Regiment

References

engineer
Engineer Regiments of the United States Army